Howlett and Bailey Architects was founded by Jeffrey Howlett and Donald Bailey in 1960, in Perth, Western Australia. They received numerous design awards and commendations from the Royal Australian Institute of Architects and won the competition for the Reserve Bank of Australia Building in Canberra in 1962. Their designs combined Modern style and Classical rationale, which resulted in ordered and axial aspects. Howlett and Baileys Architects’s major projects included the Public Suite, the  Beatty Park Pool kiosk and Manager’s house (now demolished), and the two Australian landmarks the Council House (1962) and the Perth Concert Hall (1973). Howlett and Bailey Architects merged with Cox Architects in 1995 to create Cox Howlett & Bailey Architects. In 1998 the company merged with Forbes & Fitzhardinge Woodland to form Cox Howlett & Bailey Woodland Architects, which still practices today.

Jeffrey Howlett
Jeffrey Howlett (1928–2005), founder of the Howlett and Bailey Architects firm, is known as a pioneer of Western Australian Modernist architect. He was awarded as a State Living Treasure by the Western Australian and the Life Fellowship by the RAIA in 1978. In 2000, due to his contributions to architecture as a designer and pedagogue, he was nominated a Member of the Order of Australia. After spending his early life in Hyderabad, India, Howlett came to England to receive his scholarship for Diploma in Architectural Association School of Architecture in London. From 1950, he worked in England for the London Country Council before coming to Australia to work with several Perth’s practices.  Later, Howlett came to Melbourne to continue his career as a Senior Design architect with Bates Smart and Mc Cutcheon. In Melbourne, together with Donald Bailey, who soon to be his co-operator, they won the new Perth City Council administration buildings competition. The Howlett and Bailey Architects firm was constituted after that when they moved to Perth. Donald Bailey described Howlett as a specially talent and creative designer. In 1992, there was an exhibition, held by University of Western Australia, named Howlett: Architectural projects. After suffering from a major stroke in 1993, his life was rely on the wheelchair and he mainly using oil pastel and paper to keep expressing his creativity through forms and colours. An exhibition at Perth Galleries in 2002 displayed his art works and told the story of his memories, past and present.

Major Projects

Council House, Perth
Because Perth was hosting the British Empire and Commonwealth Games in 1962, the Perth City Council decided to construct a new headquarters with a modern design to showcase the development of the state. Howlett and Bailey won the competition for the new administration building with their Council House design in 1960, out of 61 entries. The Council House was opened by Her Majesty Queen Elizabeth II in a ceremony in 1963. The design reflects the minimalist modern style which influenced the new Perth City plan. It is 13 storeys with opening extension and relative lowness.  The interior is designed to give maximum working space in relation to its gross area. The façade is constructed with windows curtain system and T shape sun hoods which provide effective use of artificial and natural lighting. Council House became the pride of Perth citizens.

Perth Concert Hall
In 1961, Howlett and Bailey Architects won another design for a town hall and auditorium for Perth: The Concert Hall. The building later was constructed from 1971 to 1973 and held an opening ceremony late 1973. Concert Hall included 2 major buildings which have an oval shape form. The style is Brutalist architecture and solid opaque internal design. Concert Hall is covered by a giant projecting roof and is made from white off-form concrete. It is a contraction to the translation of the Council House. The hall can hold up to 1720 people.

References

 Geoffrey.L, 2006, Vale Jeffrey Howlett 1928-2005 [obituary, Architecture Australia, issue:2, pg:56.
 Gregory.J, 2003, City of light : a history of Perth since the 1950s Perth, W.A. : City of Perth, pp. 172–8.
 Register Of Heritage Places- Assessment Documentation. Available from: <https://web.archive.org/web/20120227122218/http://register.heritage.wa.gov.au/PDF_Files/N%20-%20A-D/Nedlands%20Pk%20Mas%20Hall%20(I-AD).PDF>. [9 March 2003].

External links
Register Of Heritage Places- Assessment Documentation 

Architecture firms of Australia